The Chisos Formation is a geologic formation in Texas. It preserves fossils dating back to the Paleogene period.

See also

 List of fossiliferous stratigraphic units in Texas
 Paleontology in Texas
Chisos Mountains

References
 

Paleogene geology of Texas